Pune – Danapur Superfast Express is a superfast train of the Indian Railways connecting Pune Junction in Maharashtra and Danapur of Bihar. It is currently being operated with 12149/12150 train numbers on a daily basis.

Service

It averages 58 km/hr as 12149/une – Danapur Superfast Express and covers 1748 km in 30 hrs 23 mins & 57 km/hr as 12150/Danapur – Pune SF Express  and covers 1748 km in 30 hrs 45 mins.

Route & Halts 

The important halts of the train are :

 
Daund Chord Line
 
 Belapur

Coach composite

The train consists of 21 coaches:

 2 AC II Tier
 7 AC III Tier
 6 Sleeper Coaches
 3 General
 1 Pantry Car
 2 Second-class Luggage/parcel van

Traction

As the route is yet to be fully electrified, it is hauled by a Pune Diesel Loco Shed  based wap4 locomotive from Pune to Danapur.

Direction Reversal

It passes without rake reversal.

See also 

 Pune–Darbhanga Gyan Ganga Express

References

External links 

 12149/Pune – Danapur SF Express
 12150/Danapur – Pune SF Express

Rail transport in Maharashtra
Rail transport in Madhya Pradesh
Rail transport in Uttar Pradesh
Rail transport in Bihar
Transport in Pune
Express trains in India
Transport in Patna